A pennant is a commemorative pennon typically used to show support for a particular athletic team. Pennants have been historically used in all types of athletic levels: high school, collegiate, professional etc. Traditionally, pennants were made of felt and fashioned in the official colors of a particular team. 

Often graphics, usually the mascot symbol, as well as the team name were displayed on pennants. The images displayed on pennants were either stitched on with contrasting colored felt or had screen-printing. 

Today, vintage pennants with rare images or honoring special victories have become prized collectibles for sporting enthusiasts. While pennants are typically associated with athletic teams, pennants have also been made to honor institutions and vacation spots, often acting as souvenirs.

Association football 

The swapping of pennants between captains before a match is also a long-held tradition in association football.

Australian sports 
In Australian sports, the term "flag" is used in the same context. The first ever "flag" was awarded to Fitzroy after the club won the 1895 VFA premiership, and gave rise to the tradition of the "flag" being unfurled at the premiership club's first home match of the following season.

Baseball 

In Major League Baseball, a pennant typically refers to such a flag flown specifically by the National League or American League championship team of a given season, or to such a championship itself. The last few weeks of the regular American professional baseball season are known as a pennant race: this is a reference to the period between 1876-1968 when the league championships were determined by the team with the best record at the end of the regular season. 

The pennant winners earn the right to play in MLB's title round, the World Series. Since 1969, the pennants are determined by the National and American League Championship Series playoffs, analogous to the NBA and NHL Conference Finals series, and the NFL's NFC and AFC Championship Games.

See also
Gonfalon

References

Association football culture
Australian rules football culture
Baseball culture
Sports paraphernalia
Sports memorabilia